Xinyi Glass Holdings Limited is a private company in People's Republic of China, engaged in the production of float glass, automobile glass and construction glass. Its customers includes large international automobile corporations such as Ford, General Motors and Volkswagen of Germany. It was established in 1988 and headquartered in Hong Kong. It was listed on the Hong Kong Stock Exchange in 2005. In 2020, a proposed plant by Xinyi in Stratford, Ontario attracted protests on environmental and national security grounds, and was later abandoned. It has become a constituent of the Hang Seng Index (HSI) since 6 September 2021.

See also
 Xinyi Solar Holdings Limited

References

External links

Companies listed on the Hong Kong Stock Exchange
Glassmaking companies of China
Privately held companies of China
Chinese companies established in 1988
Manufacturing companies of Hong Kong
Hong Kong brands
Manufacturing companies established in 1988